Beauchamps (French for beautiful fields) may refer to several communes in France:

 Beauchamps, Manche, in the Manche département
 Beauchamps, Somme, in the Somme département
 Beauchamps-sur-Huillard, in the Loiret département

See also
 Beauchamp (disambiguation)